Peace & Love is the tenth solo album by singer/songwriter Juliana Hatfield. The album is noteworthy in Hatfield's catalogue for her role in every aspect of its recording: Hatfield wrote and performed all of the songs on the album, in addition to playing all of the instruments. She also produced and engineered the album herself, and she released the album on Ye Olde Records, her own label

Track listing
all songs written by Juliana Hatfield

Personnel
Juliana Hatfield – vocals and all instruments

Production
Producer and Engineer: Juliana Hatfield

References

2010 albums
Juliana Hatfield albums